Afula ( Arabic: العفولة) is a city in the Northern District of Israel, often known as the "Capital of the Valley" due to its strategic location in the Jezreel Valley.

Afula's ancient tell suggests habitation from the Late Calcolithic period to the Ayyubid period. It has been proposed that Afula is the location of the village Arbela mentioned in the Onomasticon of Eusebius and the 7th century Samaritan village of Kirjath Ophlatha. A fortress was built at the site during the Mamluk period.

A small Palestinian Arab village during the Ottoman period, it was sold in 1872 with the entire Jezreel valley to the Lebanese Sursock family. In 1925, the same area was acquired by the American Zionist Commonwealth as part of the Sursock Purchase. The majority Muslim and Christian population were removed, and replaced by Jewish immigrants, marking the foundation of modern Afula. After the establishment of the State of Israel in 1948, Afula was settled by Jewish immigrants from Iraq, Yemen and Romania. In 1972, it gained the status of a city. The 1990s saw Jewish immigration from Ethiopia and the former Soviet Union contribute to the growth of the city. Since 1995, the city has almost doubled its population.

Etymology
The name follows that of the small Arab village which occupied the site until WW1, possibly originating in the Canaanite-Hebrew root ʿofel "fortress tower", or the Arab word for "ruptured".

History
An ancient mound or tell known as Tell ʿAfula, located in the heart of modern ʿAfula, suggests almost continuous habitation from the Late Chalcolithic (fourth millennium BCE) to the Ayyubid period in the 13th century. At the beginning of the twentieth century the mound served as a refuse dump for the nearby Arab village of el-Fuleh.

Bronze Age to Byzantine period
For archaeological finds from Tell ʿAfula predating the Crusader/Mamluk fortress, see the archaeology paragraph.

ʿAfula is possibly the place ʿOphlah, mentioned in the lists of Pharaoh Thutmose III. Zev Vilnay suggested to identify Afula with biblical Ophel, mentioned in 2 Kings. With the destruction of the Kingdom of Israel, the area continued to be inhabited, and excavations have revealed artifacts from the periods of Persian and Roman rule. It may be identified with Arbela mentioned in the Onomasticon of Eusebius. Claude Reignier Conder suggested that ʿAfula was identical with Kirjath Ophlathah, a place inhabited by Samaritans in the 7th century.

Crusader/Ayyubid and Mamluk periods

At the centre of Tell ʿAfula stand the remains of a 19-metre square fortress from the Mamluk period, possibly first built during the Crusader period. The lower four courses are made of rough boulders, while the top remaining layer is made of reused Roman sarcophagi. The wall is a total of 5.5 meters tall. Pottery remains indicate that it was occupied in the twelfth and thirteenth century. The gate is dated based on pottery findings to the Mamluk period (13th–14th centuries CE), but so far (after the June 2017 campaign) it couldn't be determined when fortress itself was built, since it is perfectly possible that just the gate was renovated in the Mamluk period; the square shape and the use of Roman sarcophagi as building stones is closely resembling the Crusader fortress at Sepphoris.

In 1321, ʿAfula was mentioned under the name of Afel by Marino Sanuto the Elder.

Ottoman period
A map by Pierre Jacotin from Napoleon's invasion of 1799 showed this place, named as Afouleh in a French transliteration of the Arabic.

In 1816, James Silk Buckingham passed by and described Affouli as being built on rising ground, and containing only a few dwellings. He noted several other nearby settlements in sight, all populated by Muslims.

In 1838, Edward Robinson described both ʿAfula and the adjacent El Fuleh as "deserted".
 William McClure Thomson, in a book published in 1859, noted that ʿAfula and the adjacent El Fuleh were "both now deserted, though both were inhabited twenty-five years ago when I first passed this way." Thomson blamed their desertion on the bedouin.

In 1875 Victor Guérin described ʿAfula as a village on a small hill overlooking a little plain. The houses were built of adobe and various other materials. Around the well, which Guérin thought was probably ancient, he noticed several broken sarcophagi serving as troughs. In 1882, the Palestine Exploration Fund's Survey of Western Palestine described El ʿAfula as a small adobe village in the plain, supplied by two wells.

A population list from about 1887 showed that el ʿAfula had about 630 inhabitants, all Muslim. Gottlieb Schumacher, as part of surveying for the construction of the Jezreel Valley railway, noted in 1900 that it consisted of 50-55 huts and had 200 inhabitants. North of the village was a grain stop, belonging to the Sursocks.

In 1904 the Ottoman authorities inaugurated the Jezreel Valley railway, at first operating between Haifa and Beysan via ʿAfula and soon extended to Dera'a. Work eventually continued with an extension towards Jerusalem, the connection to Jenin being completed in 1913.

First World War

During World War I, ʿAfulah was a major communications hub. In 1917, when Colonel Richard Meinertzhagen from the British intelligence established contact with the Nili Jewish spy network in Palestine, a German Jewish doctor stationed at al ʿAfulah railway junction provided the British with valuable reconnaissance reports on Ottoman and German troop movements southwards.

With the advance of General Edmund Allenby's British forces into Ottoman Palestine, al ʿAfulah was captured by the 4th Cavalry Division of the Desert Mounted Corps, during the cavalry phase of the Battle of Sharon in September 1918.

British Mandate

According to the British Mandate's 1922 census of Palestine, Affuleh had 563 inhabitants; 471 Muslims, 62 Christians, 28 Jews and 2 followers of the Baháʼí Faith; 61 of the Christians were Orthodox, while one was Melkite.

Jewish Afula (est. 1925)
In 1925, the area was acquired by the American Zionist Commonwealth as part of the Sursock Purchase. A quarter of the one hundred Arab families who had lived in the area accepted compensation for their land and left voluntarily; the remainder were evicted. Jews began settling in ʿAfula shortly after as the town developed. Nearby land had been purchased in a similar manner in 1909 or 1910, when Yehoshua Hankin bought 10,000 dunams (10 km2) of land on which Merhavia and Tel Adashim were to be built (this was Hankin's first major purchase in the Jezreel Valley).

By the 1931 census, the population had increased to 874; with 786 Jews, 86 Muslims, nine Christians, and three classified as "no religion", in a total of 236 houses.

In a 1945 survey the population of ʿAfula was estimated as 2300 Jews and ten Muslims. The town had a total of 18,277 dunams of land, according to an official land and population survey. Of this, 145 dunams of land was used to cultivate citrus and bananas, 347 dunams were for plantations and irrigable land, 15,103 for cereals, while 992 dunams were built-up land.

During this time, the community was served by the Jezreel Valley Railway, a side branch of the larger Hejaz Railway. Since 1913 it had also been the terminus station of the branch connecting it to Jenin and later also to Nablus. Sabotage actions of Jewish underground militias in 1945, 1946 and shortly before the 1948 Arab–Israeli War rendered first the connection to Jenin, then progressively the entire Valley Railway, inoperable.

State of Israel

Railroad (1948-49; 2010s)
Repairs to the Jezreel Valley Railway after 1948 restored service to Haifa, but only until 1949 when it was abandoned. In 2011 construction began on a large-scale project to build a new standard gauge railway from Haifa to Beit She'an with stations in Afula and other towns, along roughly the same route as the historic valley railway. Israel Railways began passenger service on the new railway on October 16, 2016.

Terror attacks (1990s-2000s)
Due to Afula's proximity to the West Bank, it has been a target for Palestinian political violence. On 6 April 1994, the Afula Bus suicide bombing killed five people in the center of Afula. In the Afula axe attack in November 1994, a 19-year-old female soldier was attacked and murdered by an axe-wielding Arab Hamas member. ʿAfula also was the target of a suicide attack on a bus on 5 March 2002, in which one person died and several others were injured at ʿAfula's central bus station. In the Afula mall bombing on 19 May 2003, a woman suicide bomber blew herself up at the Amakim mall, killing three and wounding 70. This attack was claimed by the Islamic Jihad Movement in Palestine and the Fatah movement's Al-Aqsa Martyrs Brigades.

2006 Lebanon War
On 17 July 2006, during the 2006 Lebanon War, Hezbollah fired Katyusha rockets at ʿAfula, one of the southernmost rocket attacks on Israel from Lebanon. Six people were treated for shock as a result of the attack. On 28 July, a rocket landed causing a fire. The rocket carried  of explosives.

Recent development plans
In September 2016, it was announced that seven new neighborhoods would be built, doubling the city's population.

Notable incidents
In June 2018, 150 of the city's Jewish residents protested against the sale of a home to an Arab family. Former Afula Mayor Avi Elkabetz joined the protest and said, "the residents of Afula don't want a mixed city, but rather a Jewish city, and it's their right. This is not racism."

In June 2019, a demonstration happened in protest against a house being sold to an Arab family, joined by Afula's mayor, Avi Elkabetz. He previously ran for office on a platform of “preserving the Jewish character of Afula.”

Climate
Afula has a mediterranean climate (Köppen climate classification: Csa).

Economy

The Alon Tavor Industrial Zone is located northeast of Afula off Highway 65. The Tadiran air conditioner factory is located there. Two Israeli plastics manufacturers, Keter Plastic and StarPlast, are also based there.

Education and culture

According to CBS, there are 24 schools and 8,688 students in the city: 16 elementary schools with a student population of 3,814 and 12 high schools with 4,874 students. 52.3% of 12th grade students were entitled to a matriculation certificate in 2001.

Health care
HaEmek Medical Center in Afula was the first regional hospital in Israel.

Archaeology

The ancient mound of ʿAfula, known as Tell ʿAfula, is close to the city center, west of Route 60 and south of Ussishkin Street. Very little of the initial six-acre tell remains due to construction work done in this area since the British Mandate period. The southern peak of the mound is the better preserved part. It was once widely considered to be the biblical site of Ophrah, the hometown of the judge Gideon, but contemporary scholars generally disagree with this supposition. Archaeological finds date from the Chalcolithic through the Byzantine period, followed by remains from the Crusader and Mamluk periods.

The first excavations at Tell ʿAfula, carried out in 1948, found Late Chalcolithic–Early Bronze Age remains. Tombs from the Early Bronze Age, Middle Bronze Age II, Late Bronze Age–Iron Age I and Roman period were discovered near the municipal water tower. Archaeologists discovered the Crusader-Mamluk fortress on the southern peak of the tell, a Byzantine olive oil press and evidence of an Early Bronze Age settlement near the northern peak.

In 1950–1951, excavations on the northwestern slope of the peak revealed a pottery workshop for Tell el-Yahudiyeh Ware from Middle Bronze Age II and another pottery workshop from Middle Bronze Age I.

From the 1990s, several small excavations unearthed an uninterrupted sequence of settlement remains from the Chalcolithic until the Late Byzantine periods as well as remains from the Mamluk period.

In 2012, excavations were conducted by the Israel Antiquities Authority on the southern peak of Tell ʿAfula where the Crusader-Mamluk fortress is located. Due to construction activity from the 1950s, settlement layers on the tell may have been destroyed. Only meager remnants were found, indicative of a settlement from Early Bronze Age I and the Roman period. Pottery from Early Bronze Age III, Iron Age I and a single Hellenistic Attic fragment indicate settlement on the tell in these periods. Fragments of glazed bowls from the thirteenth century (Mamluk period) were found along the southern edge of the excavation.

Sports
The city's basketball club, Hapoel Afula, currently play in the Liga Leumit.
The main football club, Hapoel Afula, won Liga Alef in the 2012–13 season and is currently playing at Liga Leumit.

Twin towns

Notable people
Mosh Ben-Ari (born 1970), musician, lyricist and composer
Amir Blumenfeld (born 1983), writer, comedian, actor, and television host
Yaakov Bodo (born 1931), actor and comedian
Dina Doron (born 1940), actress
Sarit Hadad (born 1978), singer
Eden Kartsev (born 2000), football player
David Kushnir (born 1931), Olympic long-jumper
Hila Lulu Linn (born 1964), artist
Nikol Reznikov (born 1999), model and Miss Universe Israel 2018
Samuel Scheimann (born 1987), football player
 Dagan Yivzori (born 1985), basketball player

References

Bibliography

 
 

 

 

 

 

 Zevulun, U., "Tell el-Yahudiyeh Juglets from a Potter’s Refuse Pit at Afula", ''Eretz-Israel 21 (1990), pp. 174–190, p. 107.

External links

Afula municipal website
Central Bureau of Statistics, Afula
Survey of Western Palestine, Map 8: IAA, Wikimedia commons
Afula municipal website on russian lang/
Air-photo of Afula with index, 1946 - Eran Laor Cartographic Collection, The National Library of Israel

Canaanite cities
Populated places established in 1925
Jewish villages in Mandatory Palestine
1925 establishments in Mandatory Palestine
Cities in Northern District (Israel)